Dick Borrell (born September 24, 1951) was an American politician

Borrell lived in Waverly, Minnesota and graduated from St. Mary's Catholic High School in Waverly. He served in the United States Marine Corps. Borrell received his two bachelor's degrees in business education and business administration from Minnesota State University, Mankato in Mankato, Minnesota. He was a businessman and high school business teacher. Borrell served in the Minnesota House of Representatives in 2003 and 2004 and was a Republican. He was a Democrat until he switched to the Republican Party in the late 1980s.

References

1951 births
Living people
People from Wright County, Minnesota
Military personnel from Minnesota
Minnesota State University, Mankato alumni
Businesspeople from Minnesota
Schoolteachers from Minnesota
Minnesota Democrats
Minnesota Republicans
Members of the Minnesota House of Representatives